Stephen Reed Benson (born January 2, 1954), is a Pulitzer Prize-winning editorial cartoonist.

Biography
Stephen Benson was born on January 2, 1954, in Sacramento, California. As the grandson of former U.S. Secretary of Agriculture and former LDS Church president Ezra Taft Benson, he attended Brigham Young University, from which he graduated cum laude, and became the cartoonist for the Arizona Republic in 1980.  He moved to the Tacoma Morning News Tribune in 1990, but then returned to the Arizona Republic in 1991, and remained until laid off in January 2019. Benson is now the staff political cartoonist for Arizona Mirror news and his work continues to be nationally distributed by Creators Syndicate.

Awards
Benson was awarded the 1993 Pulitzer Prize for Editorial Cartooning, was a Pulitzer finalist in 1984, 1989, 1992, and 1994, and has received a variety of other awards. He has served as president of the Association of American Editorial Cartoonists. His cartoons have been collected in a number of books.

Controversy

In the late 1980s he was at first a supporter, then a prominent critic, of Evan Mecham, the first Mormon to be elected governor of Arizona.  Benson's criticism stirred controversy among Arizona's Mormon population, leading some LDS Church members to seek the intervention of Benson's grandfather in the matter. In the midst of the scandal, Governor Mecham telephoned Benson and told him to stop drawing critical cartoons about him, or his eternal soul would be in jeopardy. Benson was later relieved of his position on a stake high council.

In 1993 Benson faced further controversy within the LDS Church, when he stated that his grandfather, then nearing his 94th birthday, was suffering from senility that was being concealed by church leadership.  Later that year, Benson publicly left the church. He has since become a critic of religious belief, appearing at Freedom From Religion Foundation's annual conventions and stating in its paper Freethought Today, "If, as the true believers claim, the word 'gospel' means good news, then the good news for me is that there is no gospel, other than what I can define for myself, by observation and conscience. As a freethinking human being, I have come not to favor or fear religion, but to face and fight it as an impediment to civilized advancement."

In 1997, a Benson cartoon used the image of a firefighter carrying a dead child to comment on the death sentence that had just been imposed on Oklahoma City bombing defendant Timothy McVeigh.  Benson forcefully defended his work against some readers' contentions that the cartoon was insensitive.

In 1999, Benson released a political cartoon titled “Texas Bonfire Traditions”. In the cartoon, he compared the 1999 Texas A&M Bonfire Collapse to the Waco siege of 1993 and the murder of James Byrd Jr. in 1998. This prompted negative reactions and criticism from Texas A&M, and forced The Arizona Republic to remove the cartoon.

References

Further reading

External links
Benson's View, The Arizona Republic 
The Giffords Shooting, as Only a Pulitzer Prize-winning Cartoonist Could Render it
Billy Ireland Cartoon Library & Museum Art Database
 Benson’s Corner Arizona Mirror

1954 births
20th-century Mormon missionaries
American atheists
American editorial cartoonists
American Mormon missionaries in Japan
American humanists
Brigham Young University alumni
Former Latter Day Saints
Living people
Pulitzer Prize for Editorial Cartooning winners
Critics of Mormonism
Benson family